Saturate is the debut studio album by American rock band Breaking Benjamin. It was released on August 27, 2002. The album features three singles, including "Polyamorous", "Skin", and "Medicate". The album was certified gold by the RIAA on September 15, 2015.

Background 
After the commercial success of the band's lead single "Polyamorous", there was a dispute between the band and the studio on deciding on which they wanted to release as singles. The band wished for their song "Medicate", while the studio insisted on releasing "Skin" as a single. Eventually, the band decided to go with "Skin", despite some negative feedback with the band and the fairly poor success it reached. The original release of Saturate contained "Forever" as a separate track; also, the newer enhanced versions came with the "Polyamorous" music video and ultimately featured the song embedded with "Shallow Bay".

The album title is derived from a lyric in the song, "Wish I May".

On September 14, 2002, Saturate peaked on the US Billboard 200 and Heatseekers charts at number 136 and number two, respectively. "Wish I May" was featured in the horror films Wrong Turn and The Apparition, starring Tom Felton. The tracks "Home", "Shallow Bay", "Water", and "Polyamorous" were also featured in the 2002 horror game Run Like Hell.

There were also plans for a European release of the album containing the song "Lady Bug" and the Depeche Mode cover of "Enjoy the Silence," but this version of Saturate was never released in Europe, and as a result, neither track was released for the album. "Lady Bug" later appeared on their So Cold EP and on the deluxe edition of their greatest hits compilation album Shallow Bay: The Best of Breaking Benjamin. "Enjoy the Silence" appeared on the compilation in the same version. The album was eventually released in Europe in 2006, but these tracks still were not included.

Track listing

Personnel

Breaking Benjamin
 Benjamin Burnley – lead vocals, rhythm guitar, string arrangements
 Aaron Fink – lead guitar
 Mark Klepaski – bass guitar
 Jeremy Hummel – drums

Management
Jason Jordan – A&R

Artwork
T42Design – art direction and album design
Matthew Welch – band photography
Dr. Lukas Altwegg – cell images

Production
 Ulrich Wild – producer, engineer
 Ted Regier – assistant engineer
 Alex Reverberi – assistant engineer
 Vocals recorded May 2002 at Royaltone Studios in North Hollywood
 Chris Wonzer – assistant engineering
 Bret Alexander – vocal production on "Water", and additional vocal production on "Shallow Bay" at Saturation Acres, Pennsylvania
Paul Smith – vocal production on "Water", and additional vocal production on "Shallow Bay" at Saturation Acres, Pennsylvania
 Chris Lord-Alge – mixing at Image Recording Studios, Hollywood, California
 Stephen Marcussen – mastering at Marcussen Mastering
 Susie Katayama – string arrangements

Chart positions

Album

Singles

Certifications

References

2002 debut albums
Albums produced by Ulrich Wild
Breaking Benjamin albums
Hollywood Records albums